Questions Internationales (French for International Issues) is a bimonthly French magazine founded in 2003 and published by La Documentation française. 
It offers didactic analysis on various subjects of international relations and foreign affairs, encompassing global politics, economics, European integration and transnational problems. 

Questions Internationales is popular among students, scholars, diplomats and teachers as well as among a large public. Each issue consists of a main dossier dedicated to a major topic of International relations, European affairs, a transnational or a regional matter. Each dossier is illustrated by maps and photographs. In addition to the major articles written by scholars and specialists, each issue includes short articles and photographs.

Some authors 

 Ezra Suleiman
 Georges Corm
 Charles Cogan
 Alain Dejammet
 Stella Ghervas
 G. John Ikenberry
 Daniel C. Kurtzer
 Yves Lacoste
 Emmanuel Le Roy Ladurie
 Jacques Marseille
 Thierry de Montbrial
 Philippe Moreau-Defarges
 Elias Sanbar
 Saskia Sassen
 Michel Serres
 Jack Snyder
 Georges-Henri Soutou
 Joanna Spear
 Justin Vaisse
 Hubert Védrine

References

External links 
 Official website

2003 establishments in France
Bi-monthly magazines published in France
French-language magazines
News magazines published in France
International relations journals
Magazines established in 2003
Magazines published in Paris